FK Panerys Vilnius is a defunct Lithuanian football club from the capital Vilnius, which was founded in 1975. During the 1998–1999 season in the A Lyga the club retired after six matches and was dissolved.

Season-by-season

 Lithuania
{|class="wikitable"
|-bgcolor="#efefef"
! Season
! Div.
! Pos.
! Pl.
! W
! D
! L
! Goals
! P
! Top Scorer
!Cup
!colspan=2|Europe
|-
|align=center|1991
|align=center|1st
|align=center bg=silver|8
|align=center|14
|align=center|6
|align=center|2
|align=center|6
|align=center|20–13
|align=center|14
|align=center|
|align=center|
|align=center|
|align=left|
|}

References
weltfussballarchiv

 
Defunct football clubs in Lithuania
Association football clubs established in 1975
Association football clubs disestablished in 1998
1975 establishments in Lithuania
1998 disestablishments in Lithuania